Polaris Reef is a reef, or shallows, in Frobisher Bay, near Iqaluit, Nunavut, Canada.

See also 
 USS Wacissa (AOG-59)

References 

Landforms of Baffin Island